UDRA (União Desportiva Rei Amador) is a football club that plays in the São Tomé and Príncipe Championship.  The team is based in the southern part of the island of São Tomé in the city of São João dos Angolares and plays at Campo de Ribeira Peixe nearby. The club is named after Rei Amador, a slave king in Angolares mythology.

UDRA  is recently the top 10 successful football (soccer) club in São Tomé Island and has the third most overall honours in São Tomé and Príncipe, having won about 13  official titles, seven are national and the remaining six are regional titles.

History
UDRA was founded in 1995 and being one of the first football clubs in Caué which includes the southern part of the island.  Years later, the team became a registered club.  UDRA first played in the island's second division. In 2005, UDRA celebrated its 10th anniversary of the club's foundation.

UDRA became the twelfth and recent club to win their first title and along with four other clubs, has only one national title won today.  The club now also has two national cup titles.

The club competed in the first division until the club was relegated in 2007 and did not return again until the 2009/10 season.  Four years they were the island's top five clubs, their final positions creeped up each year, fourth in 2011 with 34 points and 31 goals scored, third in 2012 and fewer points and goals with 32 and 28, second in 2013 with a higher 41 points and 37 goals.  UDRA finally finished first and won their first island title in 2014 which achieved them entry into the national championship event and competed with FC Porto Real of Príncipe with the score 2–1 away and 1–0 at home field, the match went into penalty shootouts and UDRA defeated Porto Real and became the 12th club to claim their first national title and being the only club from Caué to do so. Recently UDRA headed to the number one position during mid-season for the island, slightly lowered in the later part of the season weeks when Sporting Praia Cruz took it for a bit, in the last few weeks, UDRA took back the lead and won their second and recent regional title and achieved another entry into the national championships where they faced against Os Operários, second overall, this time in the championships in November, UDRA defeated Os Operários in all two legs and claimed their second and recent national title for the club and are now one of four clubs being fifth with the most national title with two. In the regionals, fourth ranked shared with Desportivo de Guadalupe.  UDRA did not participate into the 2018 CAF Champions League due to financial and material reasons.

Cup competitions
UDRA won their very first cup title in 2013 after defeating GD Sundy 5–1, UDRA was the first club from Caué to get a national competitive honor.  In the national cup, UDRA would go on to defeat Sporting Clube do Príncipe 2–1 to claim their second cup title, their overall totals became third.  Two years later, UDRA was cup winner of São Tomé Island and headed to the 2016 national cup finals to face GD Os Operários, UDRA defeated that club 6-2 and won their third and recent cup title and became the club solely possessing the country's third most cup titles.  Overall it was the second consecutive cup final that finished 6-2 by the cup winner.  In the 2016 island championships, the club defeated UD Correia 8-0 on July 24 and made it the highest scoring match on the island. UDRA headed to the national cup final after defeating Aliança Nacional on September 17, 2017. On November 11, UDRA faced the island's and country's top two clubs Sporting Praia Cruz and UDRA defeated that club 2-0 and won their second straight  island/regional cup title, second time UDRA did, a ticket to the national cup final was made and faced Príncipe's Porto Real on December 2, UDRA got a double where they won a second straight national cup title as they defeated Porto Real 1-0, Vando was the only scorer who scored at the 25th minute. In title totals by district by any club, Caue alongside Pagué became second out of seventh in cup totals superseded Cantagalo's three titles.

Uniform
Its uniform colors features a blue-white striped T-shirt with white sleeves with the rest of the clothing blue used during home games and orange clothing with blue socks for away/alternate games  Its shield color is brown with Rei Amador featured in the middle and the date of the foundation of the town at the bottom.

Honours
National:
São Tomé and Príncipe Championship: 3

2014, 2017, 2018

São Tomé and Príncipe Cup: 4
2013, 2014, 2016, 2017

São Tomé and Príncipe Super Cup: 1
2014

Regional:
 São Tomé First Division: 2

 2014, 2017, 2018

Taça Regional de São Tomé: 4
2013, 2014, 2016, 2017

League and cup history

Island championships

Statistics
Best position: 1st (national)
Best position at cup competitions: 1st (national)
Appearances at the national championships: 2
Appearances at a national cup competition: 4
Appearances at a national super cup competition: 4
Total goals scored at the national championships: 7
Total goals scored at the national cup final: 13
Total matches played:
National Championships: 4
National Cup: 6
Best season: 2014 (16 wins, 49 points)
Highest number of goals scored in a season: 47 (regional), in 2017

References

External links
Club profile at Soccerway
Club profile at The Final Ball

 
Caué District
Football clubs in São Tomé and Príncipe
São Tomé Island Premier Division
1995 establishments in São Tomé and Príncipe
Association football clubs established in 1995